The Integrity of Joseph Chambers is a 2022 American drama film written and directed by Robert Machoian and starring Clayne Crawford.

Cast
Clayne Crawford as Joe
Jordana Brewster as Tess
Michael Raymond-James as Lone Wolf
Jeffrey Dean Morgan as Police Chief
Carl Kennedy as Doug
Colt Crawford as Son
Hix Crawford
Charline St. Charles as Francine
Matt Frederick

Production
Production began in Alabama in December 2020.  As of May 2021, the film is in post-production.

Release
The film premiered in June 2022 at the Tribeca Film Festival.

Reception
The film has a 100% rating on Rotten Tomatoes based on 14 reviews.

David Rooney of The Hollywood Reporter gave the film a positive review, calling it "Thin but compelling."

Piers Marchant of the Arkansas Democrat-Gazette also gave the film a positive review and wrote, “ Not everything holds together exactly, storywise, but there remains more than enough filmmaking flair, and another strong, committed performance from Crawford, to anchor it down.”

References

External links
 
 

2022 films
2022 drama films
American drama films
2020s English-language films
2020s American films